Alaskapox virus is a species of the Orthopoxvirus genus, first documented in 2015 in the United States state of Alaska. As of 2022, there are four known cases of illness caused by the virus, all of which occurred in Fairbanks North Star Borough, with none resulting in hospitalization or death.

Discovery 
In July 2015, a woman visited a clinic in Fairbanks, Alaska, with lesions that were confirmed to contain an Orthopox virus but did not match any known members of the genus. Subsequent genetic analysis established that the woman, who recovered, had been infected with a novel Orthopox virus. The name Alaskapox virus was proposed after full analysis of its genome was published in 2019.

Subsequent cases 
In 2020, the Alaska Department of Health and Social Services announced the second known infection of Alaskapox in another Fairbanks woman. Two additional cases were identified in the Fairbanks area in the summer of 2021. All four known cases were mild, not requiring hospitalization.

All known cases have occurred in Fairbanks North Star Borough, but it is possible that other infections have occurred elsewhere.

Signs and symptoms 
In the identified cases, Alaskapox virus causes small lesions on the skin that heal after a few weeks, according to the Alaska Department of Health and Social Services, but the first known patient indicated the lesion took six months to fully resolve. Other reported symptoms include joint or muscle pain and swollen lymph nodes.

Transmission 
Transmission of the virus to humans is hypothesized to be via small animals, though it is not yet clear specifically how this occurs. As of 2021, there was not established evidence of transmission among humans.

References

Further reading 

Chordopoxvirinae
Virus-related cutaneous conditions